I'm Not Playin' is the only album recorded by the hip-hop duo Ultimate Force, which consisted of emcee Master Rob and DJ-producer Diamond D. The group was discovered and sponsored by Jazzy Jay in the late 1980s, and the album was recorded in his studio in the Bronx, New York, between 1988 and 1990. Ultimate Force was signed to Strong City at the time, but due to label politics and the shuttering of distributor Uni Records, the album was shelved and for the longest time the only available material from the duo was the 12" single "I'm Not Playin'", considered somewhat of an underground classic.

The rights of the Strong City catalogue were eventually acquired by Traffic Entertainment Group, and the album was finally released in the middle of 2007. I'm Not Playin' was produced by Diamond D and all vocals were handled by Master Rob, Diamond D had not yet started rhyming. Guest appearances come from a young Fat Joe who appeared on two songs, which are actually the earliest recordings of his. The CD release is a double-disc that includes the accapellas and instrumentals of all of the album's tracks.

Track listing

Album singles

2007 albums
Diamond D albums
Albums produced by Diamond D